Enad Ličina (born 14 November 1979) is a Serbian professional boxer of Bosniak origin.

Professional boxing record 

| style="text-align:center;" colspan="8"|28 wins (17 knockouts, 11 decisions),  4 losses (0 knockouts, 4 decisions), 0 draws
|-  style="text-align:center; background:#e3e3e3;"
|  style="border-style:none none solid solid; "|Res.
|  style="border-style:none none solid solid; "|Record
|  style="border-style:none none solid solid; "|Opponent
|  style="border-style:none none solid solid; "|Type
|  style="border-style:none none solid solid; "|Round
|  style="border-style:none none solid solid; "|Date
|  style="border-style:none none solid solid; "|Location
|  style="border-style:none none solid solid; "|Notes
|- align=center
|Win
|align=center|28–4||align=left| Adil Rusidi
|
|
|
|align=left|
|align=left|
|- align=center
|Win
|align=center|27–4||align=left| Josip Jalusic
|
|
|
|align=left|
|align=left|
|- align=center
|Win
|align=center|26–4||align=left| Piotr Twardowski
|
|
|
|align=left|
|align=left|
|- align=center
|- align=center
|Win
|align=center|25–4||align=left| Levan Jomardashvili
|
|
|
|align=left|
|align=left|
|- align=center
|Win
|align=center|24–4||align=left| Marko Rupčić
|
|
|
|align=left|
|align=left|
|- align=center
|- align=center
|Win
|align=center|23–4||align=left| Marcel Zeller
|
|
|
|align=left|
|align=left|
|- align=center
|- align=center
|Win
|align=center|22–4||align=left| Koeksal Orduhan
|
|
|
|align=left|
|align=left|
|- align=center
|Loss
|align=center|21–4||align=left| Aleksandr Alekseyev
|
|
|
|align=left|
|align=left|
|- align=center
|Win
|align=center|21–3||align=left| Hari Miles
|
|
|
|align=left|
|align=left|
|- align=center
|Win
|align=center|20–3||align=left| Michele De Meo
|
|
|
|align=left|
|align=left|
|- align=center
|Loss
|align=center|19–3||align=left| Steve Cunningham
|
|
|
|align=left|
|align=left|
|- align=center
|Win
|align=center|19–2||align=left| Felix Cora Jr.
|
|
|
|align=left|
|align=left|
|- align=center
|Win
|align=center|18–2||align=left| Ismail Abdoul
|
|
|
|align=left|
|align=left|
|- align=center
|Loss
|align=center|17–2||align=left| Yoan Pablo Hernandez
|
|
|
|align=left|
|align=left|
|- align=center
|Win
|align=center|17–1||align=left| Ignacio Esparza
|
|
|
|align=left|
|align=left|
|- align=center
|Win
|align=center|16–1||align=left| Jose Luis Herrera
|
|
|
|align=left|
|align=left|
|- align=center
|Win
|align=center|15–1||align=left| Otis Griffin
|
|
|
|align=left|
|align=left|
|- align=center
|Win
|align=center|14–1||align=left| DeLeon Tinsley
|
|
|
|align=left|
|align=left|
|- align=center
|Win
|align=center|13–1||align=left| Kendrick Releford
|
|
|
|align=left|
|align=left|
|- align=center
|Win
|align=center|12–1||align=left| Lubos Suda
|
|
|
|align=left|
|align=left|
|- align=center
|Win
|align=center|11–1||align=left| Rob Norton
|
|
|
|align=left|
|align=left|
|- align=center
|Win
|align=center|10–1||align=left| Tomislav Jurić Grgić
|
|
|
|align=left|
|align=left|
|- align=center
|Win
|align=center|9–1||align=left| Ismail Abdoul
|
|
|
|align=left|
|align=left|
|- align=center
|Win
|align=center|8–1||align=left| 	Łukasz Rusiewicz
|
|
|
|align=left|
|align=left|
|- align=center
|Win
|align=center|7–1||align=left| Teo Begović
|
|
|
|align=left|
|align=left|
|- align=center
|Win
|align=center|6–1||align=left| Siarhei Karanevich
|
|
|
|align=left|
|align=left|
|- align=center
|Win
|align=center|5–1||align=left| Mayala Mbungi
|
|
|
|align=left|
|align=left|
|- align=center
|Win
|align=center|4–1||align=left| Bruce Özbek
|
|
|
|align=left|
|align=left|
|- align=center
|Loss
|align=center|3–1||align=left| Aleksy Kuziemski
|
|
|
|align=left|
|align=left|
|- align=center
|Win
|align=center|3–0||align=left| Matteo Sciacca
|
|
|
|align=left|
|align=left|
|- align=center
|Win
|align=center|2–0||align=left| Dzianis Solomko
|
|
|
|align=left|
|align=left|
|- align=center
|Win
|align=center|1–0||align=left| Radek Seman
|
|
|
|align=left|
|align=left|
|- align=center

References

External links
 

1979 births
Living people
Sportspeople from Novi Pazar
Serbian people of Bosniak descent
Serbian male boxers
Cruiserweight boxers
Southpaw boxers